BioScope: South Asian Screen Studies is a blind peer-reviewed journal that provides a forum for discuss the historical, regional, and virtual spaces of screen cultures, including globalized and multi-sited conditions of production and circulation.

It is published twice in a year by SAGE Publications in association with University of Westminster and  Sarai/Centre for the Study of Developing Societies

This journal is a member of the Committee on Publication Ethics (COPE).

Abstracting and indexing 
 BioScope: South Asian Screen Studies is abstracted and indexed in:
 CCC
 DeepDyve
 Dutch-KB
 J-Gate
 OCLC
 Ohio
 Portico
 Pro-Quest-RSP
 Thomson Reuters: Arts & Humanities Citation Index 
 Bibliography of Asian Studies (BAS)
 SCOPUS

External links
 
 Homepage

References
 http://publicationethics.org/members/bioscope-south-asian-screen-studies
 http://www.westminster.ac.uk/
 http://sarai.net/

SAGE Publishing academic journals
Biannual journals
Media studies journals
Communication journals
Publications established in 2010